Saint Paul Church, located in Cranston, Rhode Island, is a parish of the Roman Catholic Diocese of Providence, Rhode Island.

History
Saint Paul Church was founded in 1907 in the Edgewood section of Cranston. The founding pastor, Father Michael McCabe, resolved that a permanent Church would not be built until a suitable school had been erected for the education of the children of the parish. The building of the school preceded the completion of the church for several years.

Architecture
Saint Paul church was designed in the neo-gothic style, begun in 1929 and completed in 1933, by the firm of ecclesiastical architect Ambrose J. Murphy, with Samuel M. Morino as chief architect. The grand design of the church was "hoped to be the equal of any church in the diocese of Providence."

The church's "crowning glory" is its stained-glass windows portraying scenes from the Bible and the lives of the Saints. The glass was designed by the firm of Earl Edward Sanborn of Boston, Massachusetts. In 2019, several of these historic stained glass windows were damaged by vandals throwing rocks.

Services

Saint Paul Church is currently served by Father Thomas J. Woodhouse, Pastor Paul Shea as Deacon Assistant, and Julie Bradley as Director of Faith Formation. The church has weekly Eucharistic Adoration and observes seasonal devotions, such as the Rosary and the Stations of the Cross.

Saint Paul Church offers service, education, and outreach programs for multiple age groups. 

The Faith Formation program is devoted to the religious formation of the parish children and teens, from Grades 1 to 10.  A special Liturgy of the Word for preschool aged children is also celebrated on Sundays. 

Each year, the church offers several adult retreats or nights of recollection.

See also

 Catholic Church in the United States
 Index of Catholic Church articles
 Catholic parish church
 Pastoral care
 St. Paul's Church (disambiguation)

References

External links
Official site of the Holy See

Churches in the Roman Catholic Diocese of Providence
Churches in Providence County, Rhode Island
Buildings and structures in Cranston, Rhode Island